Goman may refer to:
 Goman, Iran (disambiguation), places in Iran
Aleksey Goman, Russian musician and TV presenter
 Gauman, an alias of the Haitian Jean-Baptiste Perrier
 Goman-brand baked goods produced by subsidiaries of Gomanbakeren Holding AS for Coop Norge
Goman Boat Limited, Canadian boat manufacturer